Grevillea pectinata, commonly known as comb-leaf grevillea, is a species of flowering plant in the family Proteaceae and is endemic to the south of Western Australia. It is a spreading shrub with divided, comb-like leaves and mauve-pink to red and cream-coloured to yellow flowers with a red to deep pink style.

Description
The edges of the lobes are more or less rolled under, enclosing most of the lower surface. The flowers are rmauve-pink to red and cream-coloured to yellow, the style red to deep pink.

Taxonomy
Grevillea pectinata  was first formally described by botanist Robert Brown in 1830 in Supplementum primum prodromi florae Novae Hollandiae. The specific epithet (pectinata) means "in the form of a comb", referring to the leaves.

Distribution and habitat
Comb-leaf grevillea grows in mallee scrub, heath or low woodland in near-coastal areas of southern Western Australia from the Stirling Range to near Esperance and inland as far as Kulin and Lake King in the Esperance Plains and Mallee bioregions.

Conservation status
This grevillea is listed as "not threatened" by the Government of Western Australia Department of Biodiversity, Conservation and Attractions.

References

pectinata
Endemic flora of Western Australia
Eudicots of Western Australia
Proteales of Australia
Taxa named by Robert Brown (botanist, born 1773)
Plants described in 1830